Claudio Alejandro Risso (born 16 March 1988) is an Argentine footballer who currently plays for Primera B Metropolitana side Fénix as striker.

External links
 Alejandro Risso at Football Lineups

1988 births
Living people
Argentine footballers
Argentine expatriate footballers
Flandria footballers
Primera B de Chile players
Chilean Primera División players
Unión San Felipe footballers
Puerto Montt footballers
Unión La Calera footballers
Expatriate footballers in Chile
Association football forwards